The Bird Seller is a 1962 West German historical musical comedy film directed by Géza von Cziffra and starring Cornelia Froboess, Peter Weck and Albert Rueprecht.

It is an operetta film, based on the stage work of the same title by Carl Zeller. Several other film adaptations have also been made.

It was shot at the Spandau Studios in Berlin and at Linderhof Palace in Bavaria. The film's sets were designed by the art director Rolf Zehetbauer.

Cast
Cornelia Froboess as Christel
Peter Weck as Count Stanislaus
Albert Rueprecht as Vogelhändler Adam
Maria Sebaldt as Kurfürstin Marie-Luise
Ruth Stephan as Kammerzofe Melanie
Anita Höfer as Jette Speck
Rudolf Vogel as Count Weps
Georg Thomalla as Kurfürst August
Oskar Sima as Bürgermeister Speck
Rudolf Platte as Baron von Weckerli
Alice Kessler as Colin Sisters
Ellen Kessler as Colin Sisters
Franz-Otto Krüger as Commissar
Bruno W. Pantel as Bruno
Ewald Wenck as Josef

See also
The Bird Seller (1935 film)
Roses in Tyrol (1940)
The Bird Seller (1953 film)
Die Christel von der Post (1956)

References

External links

1962 musical comedy films
German musical comedy films
West German films
Films directed by Géza von Cziffra
Films based on operettas
Operetta films
Gloria Film films
German historical comedy films
1960s historical comedy films
1960s historical musical films
German historical musical films
Films shot at Spandau Studios
1960s German-language films
1960s German films